Hangar 17 is a children's variety show for 9 to 13 year olds that aired on BBC1 from 10 January 1992 to 29 March 1994. The show was presented by stand-up comedian Mickey Hutton and featured a mixture of jugglers, mime artists and comedians along with the more usual musical guests. In the first series the show promoted unsigned musical guests during a Battle of the Bands feature, but this idea was dropped from the second series in favour of more established acts such as Take That and East 17. The show also featured Brit School pupil Paul Leyshon as the show's resident DJ who joined in the second series and was produced by Peter Leslie. Both Hutton and Leyshon were joined by actress Colette Brown for the final series.

Transmissions

References

External links

1992 British television series debuts
1994 British television series endings
1990s British children's television series
BBC children's television shows
British variety television shows
English-language television shows
Television shows shot at BBC Elstree Centre